National Council of Teachers may refer to:

 National Council of Teachers of English, an education organization
 National Council of Teachers of Mathematics, the world's largest organization concerned with mathematics education